Forensic is a 2020 Indian Malayalam-language psychological thriller film co-written and co-directed by Akhil Paul and Anas Khan in their directorial debut, starring Tovino Thomas, Mamta Mohandas, Saiju Kurup, Renji Panicker, and Reba Monica John. The film premiered in Kerala, all over India and the rest of the world on 28 February 2020 and in GCC on 4 March 2020.

Plot 
A little boy smuggles organs of various animals at home from his father's meat shop and preserve them in jars under his bed. Upon discovering this, his father beats him. When he grows up, he kills his father.

Meanwhile, ACP Rithika Xavier investigates about the abduction and murder of two little girls of Trivandrum in succession. No apparent motive makes Rithika suspect that there is a serial killer. She requests a forensic team, but finds it awkward that the forensic personnel assigned is the young Samuel John Kattookkaaran, who happens to be the younger brother of her estranged husband Xavier John Kattookkaaran. It is shown that the couple broke away after the loss of one of their children apparently due to carelessness and also that the surviving child Nayana consults a psychologist, Dr. Alphonse Kurien. She also recruits an intern Shikha. Samuel concludes that the killer must be a child as the killer seems  to move comfortably through a 4-foot tunnel but is unable to dispose a body over a 5-feet wall, and also because the killer is able to blend easily in a compound of children. 

Though dismissive at first, Rithika Xavier is forced to accept Samuel's theory as an eyewitness shortly confirms a little boy dumping a dead body, though she does so in grace. Further victims are added to the list even as the police publish a sketch of the killer-child as described by the witness. Dr. Kurien states the boy in the sketch seems to be juvenile home inmate Reuben Elias (Arunamshu Dev) whom he counseled a few years back. Clinical therapist Dr. Jayakumar Menon, who handled Reuben's case, confirms that Reuben indeed demonstrated murderous psychopathic behavior and escaped from him recently. Abdul Wahab, a retired SP volunteers a test DNA for matching, which brings up a decade old forgotten serial murder case, which also happens to be the Rithika's first case. 

When three little girls of Burma Colony in the outskirts of Trivandrum were murdered in succession, and the body of another was discovered in a school bus, the police arrest the bus driver Ubaid Ahmed, but he is proven innocent as another victim is kidnapped and murdered in the same manner while he is in custody. Ubaid is freed; and with no more leads the case dies down, as the killings cease altogether. Abdul Wahab concludes that the Burma Colony killer must still be around. He also reveals that, on retirement, he took the ostracized Ubaid as his driver. Yet another victim is snatched from the hospital under the very nose of the team, mounting pressure on them. Samuel correctly double-guesses a clever ruse in the form of a candy bar dropped in a dustbin in front of the hospital but is puzzled that the DNA prints in the inside wrapper match neither those of the victim nor those of the child-killer collected from the previous incidents. 

Samuel concludes that there is a second personality behind the child-killer, probably a mastermind. Due to the intern Shikha's insight, it is discovered that this DNA matches perfectly with that of the Burma Colony murderer ten years earlier.
Reuben is shown to deliver the victims to an abandoned truck deep inside a forest. Their corpses are removed from the truck by none other than Nayana, Rithika's daughter. But Rithika is in no mood to listen as pressure mounts from the public as well as the department and makes it clear that the only target of the team is to capture Reuben. Left on his own to pursue his lead, Samuel teams up with Shikha and Abdul Wahab to research the area where the three buried Burma Colony victims were found. Searching the place with ground-penetrating radars, they find five skeletons - one adult and four children - buried.

Samuel decides to examine every one of the hundreds of medical and police personnel present at the hospital during the last abduction, for which DNA samples are procured with the help of Abdul Wahab and Dr. Kurien. Rithika zeroes in on Reuben and captures him from a church, Samuel is baffled to find that not a single DNA from the collection matches the one on the candy wrapper. Reuben delivers apocalyptic delusions on the inquest, which is conveniently taken as a confession by Rithika and the team. Samuel, however, observes from the footage of the inquest that Reuben was in fact responding to instructions from his hearing aid, probably from the mastermind. By the time he arrives at the station, Reuben has killed himself per transmitted instructions. Rithika was in an inquiry about Reuben's death in her custody. 

When a broken Rithika is unable to handle Nayana, Samuel convinces her to let Nayana stay with the Xavier family for the weekend. At their residence, Samuel is informed by Shikha that a blue Honda Civic car could be seen near the station premises in the footage around the time of Reuben's suicide. Noticing the exact model right outside his gate, Samuel proceeds to check, only to get knocked out and abducted by Ubaid. The team is knocked to action by yet another kidnapping, this time of none other than the daughter of a member of the team. Confronted with the undeniable evidence that they were in the wrong, the team proceeds to track the GPS of the victim's mobile phone. In the abandoned truck in a forest, the psychotic Ubaid taunts a bound Samuel with shocking details. He starts with video footage of none other than his niece and Rithika’s daughter, Nayana delivering the murdered victims out of the truck. 

Ubaid reveals that the whole saga was planned to frame Nayana as a serial killer as vengeance for ruining his life in the Burma Colony case. This is followed by the revelation that the other child of the Xavier couple and Nayana’s twin, Navya, whom everyone thought had died, is alive, supported by a video showing a disheveled Navya confined in a basement. He taunts Samuel by swearing vengeance on Rithika and her family, and attempts to kill him. Though Samuel wriggles himself out and subdues Ubaid, he is unable to extract further information about the mastermind, and Ubaid is unexpectedly shot dead by somebody in the blue Honda Civic. Samuel doggedly pursues the car and is cleverly led to take up a yellow minivan, only to end up in front of the police and discover the minivan contains the body of the latest victim. Framed as the murderer, Samuel flees but is supported by his brother Xavier, Shikha, and Abdul Wahab. They arrange for a meeting with Rithika, who is forced to accept the facts, confronted with the evidence on Ubaid's mobile phone.

Navya's location can be traced to a 500m radius of Ubaid's location, but with the impending doom that she shall be in danger once the murderer realizes that Ubaid's phone is lost. Rithika and Xavier go to the location to search for Navya, while Samuel asks Dr. Alphonse Kurien to join him for a ride discuss the case, during which Samuel reveals to him that he knows Dr. Kurien is the mastermind behind the killing. A flashback shows that Dr. Kurien was the kid, who killed his father for smuggling organs in the begiining, but was leading a normal life for his wife. After her death he lived for his son, Naveen, has but everything came crashing down after he was diagnosed with blood cancer. Dr. Kurein lost control of himself when he drops off his son's friend in the Burma Colony and then proceeds to take out his frustration of the medical condition by killing the kids in that colony. 

When Rithika arrives to search the colony he transfers his next victim from his car to a school bus, he sees parked near the road, which was accidentally witnessed by Naveen, who was in the car with him. Later in the evening on the news Ubaid's arrest is shown, because of the child found on the school bus. Naveen watches the news and realizes that his father is the killer and goes to the terrace to check a room that his father keeps locked, realizing that it was the room in which he killed his victims. Dr. Kurien tries to explain everything to his son who tries to get away from him and accidentally falls off the terrace and dies. Dr. Kurien buries his son's body and kills one more child just to prove to the police the Ubaid isn't the real killer. Later, he decides to take vengeance on Rithika by kidnapping her daughter and raises her in captivity. He then meets Reuben Elias and plans to use him and Navya in his plan. 

Dr. Kurein guesses correctly that Samuel has not handed him over to the police as he and his family would prioritise the safety of his missing niece Navya, and plans to use it as a backup to escape from Samuel and Rithika. He also tells Samuel that they have no proof connecting the killings to him and that he had tested his blood and it wasn't a match. A flashback shows Samuel telling Shikha that Dr. Alphonse Kurien has two sets of DNA because of his bone marrow transplant but his skin and hair cells will have his old DNA which is enough proof to tie him to the case. Rithika and Xavier find Navya. 

Shocked, Kurien wrestles and tries to attack Samuel which leads to an accident, and Kurien is thrown out and dies while Samuel protected by the airbags. A few days later Rithika applies for a 2-month leave to spend with her family before which she is handed a new case file form for which she requests the same forensic team. She is also seems to have reconciled with her husband who spends time with both their daughters. She calls Shikha who informs her that Samuel is in an inquiry about the accident. In the inquiry, Samuel tells the police exactly what happens as seen earlier. Later on, it is revealed that during the fight in the car, Samuel managed to unbuckle Dr. Alphonse Kurien's seat-belt which caused him to be thrown out of the car.

Cast

Marketing
The official trailer of the film was launched by Muzik247 on 13 February 2020. The film was also released worldwide via Netflix on 7 June 2020.

Release
The film was theatrically released on 28 February 2020. The film was a financial success at the box office despite theatre shutdowns all over India due to Covid-19, collecting INR 15 Crores in 13 days from Kerala alone and INR 25 Crores worldwide, including Satellite and other Digital rights.

A popular Hyderabad based production house named Geetha Arts owned by Allu Arvind, bought the Telugu dubbing rights of the film. The Telugu dubbed version had a digital release on Aha. The film was also dubbed in Hindi and directly premiered on Zee Cinema on 13 May 2021.

It went on to become the highest rated Malayalam movie of 2020 with a 14.67 TRP following its release on Asianet.

Remake
Vikrant Massey is touted to portray the lead role in the Hindi remake.
Radhika Apte, Harbandana Kaur, Prachi Desai and Rohit Roy has also joined the cast. It was released on ZEE 5 on 24th June 2022

Music
Jakes Bejoy handled the music and background score of the film.

References

External links
 

2020s Malayalam-language films
Indian mystery thriller films
Indian psychological thriller films
Films shot in Thiruvananthapuram
2020s mystery thriller films
2020 films
2020 psychological thriller films
Films scored by Jakes Bejoy